Daryl Jake Borja Ruiz (born February 16, 1996), known professionally as Skusta Clee, is a Filipino rapper, singer-songwriter, actor and a member of the Filipino hip-hop collective Ex Battalion. He is known for his numerous hit singles "Zebbiana", "Pauwi Nako", and "Dance With You" and is notably regarded as the pioneer of the Pinoy trap genre, as he first started the mainstream trap movement in the country. He is also a member of O.C. Dawgs, a hip-hop group he formed in 2012.

History and career
A controversial figure in local hip-hop, Ruiz is perhaps the most prominent hip-hop artist in the Philippines from the late 2010s. He has amassed billions of combined streams on all digital platforms, such as Spotify and YouTube. He is the pioneer of the Pinoy trap genre, as he started the mainstream trap movement in the country. His tracks dominated Musical.ly in 2016, and which he joined the collective Ex Battalion in the same year.

The singer-rapper is also an artist of Ex Battalion's partner label, Panty Droppaz League. Among the label's greatest hits which gave rise to its phenomenal success are Pauwi Nako, Zebbiana, and Dance With You which were released in 2018, 2019, and 2020, garnering hundreds of millions of views and streams on YouTube and Spotify.

In 2019, Ruiz starred on the box-office feature Sons of Nanay Sabel alongside his groupmates from Ex Battalion.

In Coco Martin and Angelica Panganiban's 2021 romantic comedy film Love or Money, Ruiz's Zebbiana was used as the movie's theme song and became part of its official soundtrack.

On June 20, 2021, Skusta Clee released the song "Lagi".  The video for the song included his newborn daughter.

On October 31, 2021, Skusta Clee released Karma featuring Gloc-9, with an accompanying Thriller-inspired music video starring Bea Alonzo and Awra Briguela. The short film was premiered on Halloween and gained over 2 million views and took the top trending spot on YouTube PH shortly after its release. Alonzo also considers the music video as her Halloween entry for the year. The song is produced by Daniel "Flip D" Tuazon and Christian "Chriilz" Andalez and the music video is directed by Titus Cee.

In 2022, the music video of Skusta Clee's Dance With You featuring Yuri Dope became the fastest top-grossing OPM music video of all time, it is the first to cross 190 million views to date, surpassing Sarah Geronimo's Tala which came in second with 187 million views in the most-viewed OPM music videos in the country.

Controversies

"Tap Na" controversy 
In late 2019, a video clip of Ruiz scoffing at unknown rappers have gone viral. The 12-second video sparked heated debate among netizens for his 'unpleasant' attitude. A year later, the rapper-singer songwriter reused the catchphrase "Tap na" (stop) as a closing line in his verse in Ex Battalion's diss track Yearly. The track depicts the group's success and its presence being 'timely' in the rap scene, and is also a response to its detractors.

Discography

Singles

As a lead artist

As a featured artist

Personal life
His former partner, Filipina-Lebanese YouTuber Zeinab Harake, gave birth to a daughter fathered by Ruiz on April 28, 2021.  In May 2022, Harake confirmed her break-up with Ruiz.

Awards and nominations

References

1996 births
Living people
Filipino rappers
People from Metro Manila
People from Taguig
Tagalog people
Universal Records (Philippines) artists
21st-century Filipino male singers
Ex Battalion members